The Royal Navy Propellant Factory, Caerwent was a facility at Caerwent, Monmouthshire, Wales, UK, (later RAF Caerwent) which was originally dedicated to the manufacture and storage of Royal Naval munitions. Since its closure as an armament works in 1966, it has been used by the US military and the British Army. It is now used as the Caerwent Training Area. A new purpose-built military barracks is set to be built on the site to house 1st The Queen's Dragoon Guards and 1st Battalion, The Rifles from 2027.

The factory had its own standard gauge railway system, miles of roads and a wide range of buildings, from small earth-banked bomb stores to large four storey built brick buildings.

Since 1993, the former factory site has been used for a variety of military and civil purposes, including military field exercises, car rallying, storage and breakdown of railway vehicles, nature preservation, and leisure activities such as Airsoft.

Planning and construction
In the summer of 1936 the Royal Navy drew up prequirements for a new factory were drawn up. The main priorities were:
the establishment should not be vulnerable to air attack;
should not be located in an industrial area, but sufficiently close to a populated area to provide an adequate workforce;
should be close to a railway and to main roads;
should be located on rough grassland with a gravel on sand subsoil with good natural drainage and a slope of about 1 in 30 to provide maximum safety in the highly dangerous nitroglycerine manufacturing and handling areas;

Like all explosive factories of this type, a capacious supply of water was required for use in the manufacturing processes. To manufacture 150 tons of cordite per week the factory would need 3 million imperial gallons (14,000 m³) of drinking quality water per day.

In latter part of the 19th century, the Great Western Railway (GWR) had undertaken the engineering feat of constructing the Severn Tunnel under the River Severn. One of the major difficulties encountered underground was the 'Great Spring', which necessitated the pumping of over 9 million gallons (41,000 m³) of water per day, at Sudbrook, from the western end of the tunnel, conveniently located only three miles (5 km) away from the proposed site at Caerwent. Even during the great drought of 1934 the lowest daily return was 9.1 million imperial gallons (41,000 m³). The GWR used about 1.5 million imperial gallons (6,800 m³) per day themselves, so there was always a guaranteed daily surplus of 7.5 million imperial gallons (34,000 m³).

Work began to create the propellants factory in 1939. A total of £4.7 million was spent on buildings and roads, and £2.5 million on plant and equipment. The scale of site consumed the village of Dinham which was located at the northern edge of the RNPF Caerwent.

By the end of 1940 the Main Office block was complete, and in December of that year the Unit 1 Sulphuric Acid Factory went into production with acid mixing for the Nitrocellulose and Nitroglycerine manufacturing. Five months later, the Pressure Oxidation Plant for the manufacture of Nitric acid came on stream. In August 1941 the Nitrocellulose and Nitroglycerine plants were operational and were soon working 24 hours a day on a three-shift pattern. At the same time, Unit 2 of the factory was almost completed, so RNPF Caerwent was now virtually operational.

Cold War
Between 1955 and 1966, Caerwent produced the Gosling solid rocket booster for the Seaslug missile. This Cold War work began in wartime buildings, the horizontal presses in Press Houses 3 and a longer press in 1, and with other work in a disused blending house and the Tetryl Acetone Recovery building. From 1957 dedicated buildings, J1...J6, were constructed on the eastern side of the site for the production of guided weapons propellants. Buildings J7...J9 at the northern edge of the site formed a static testing site, where these motors could be test-fired. J7 was an environmental conditioning building where charges could be heated to 70 °C or cooled to -40 °C before testing. These buildings were of typical flat-roofed red brick construction, shielded by large earth traverses. Testing work was also carried out here on the Magpie, Redtop and Sealyham rocket motors.

Early in the 1960s a Parliamentary working party recommended that propellants for the three branches of the armed services should be concentrated at the Royal Ordnance Factory at ROF Bishopton. The decision to close RNPF Caerwent was announced on 25 March 1965. Production continued during the following two-year rundown phase. The last Gosling motor was produced on 14 June 1966, before tooling was transferred to Bishopston.

RAF Caerwent 
RAF Caerwent was transferred to US administration after Charles de Gaulle expelled the US military from France in 1967. Caerwent became part of the United States Army European 'theatre reserve stocks' under the command of the United States Army's "47th Area Support Group Reserve Storage Activity", and became known as USADA Caerwent (United States Arms Depot Activity – Caerwent).

The US Army spent over £4 million constructing 300 magazines and converting some of the former RNPF structures to conform to the required specification. The material stored included small arms ammunition, artillery shells (up to 8"), anti-tank mines, grenades, flares, and the multiple launch rocket system. The first shipments of shells, rockets, mines, flares and small arms ammo arrived early in 1968 with shipments arriving by rail as far as practicable. At its height Caerwent was among the larger ammunition supply depots in Western Europe, storing over 80,000 tonnes of conventional munitions, a substantial fraction of the US Army's European stocks. In 1990 Caerwent shipped 12,000 tons of ammunition to the Middle East and played a critical part in Operation Desert Shield and Desert Storm.

Following the change in the political climate in Europe and subsequent scaling down of operations, the US Army announced it was to close down their storage operations at the establishment in June 1992. Over 60,000 tonnes of munitions were moved out over a period of less than ten months. The last batch was removed by train on 19 July 1993. The formal closure ceremony took place on 20 August 1993.

Training centre
There are not only over 400 buildings and bunkers on the site, but also a comprehensive road system, for logistics exercises and driver training. Improvements to the site were completed at a cost of £150,000 in November 2015.

The 1st The Queen's Dragoon Guards are scheduled to move to Caerwent in 2028.

Railway
The site was connected to the Great Western railway at Caldicot Junction, near Sudbrook by way of a private branch line, sometimes known as the MoD Caerwent siding. There were a number of transfer sidings within the factory.

After the privatisation of British Rail, RNPF Caerwent like a number of other MOD sites with internal railway sidings, was used as a secure storage area for holding surplus locomotives and rolling stock that might be returned to use. A small number of electric locomotives, particularly in the British Rail Class 86 and British Rail Class 87, were scrapped at RNPF Caerwent. Between 2008 and 2014, the railway tracks were removed but the trackbeds left in situ. A number of unsafe buildings and redundant acid storage facilities have also been removed since 2014.

In summer 2022, work began to remove the final stretches of track that remained within the site and on the connecting branch line. The disassembled rails will be transported to the Gwili Railway, a Welsh heritage railway at Carmarthen. The former trackbed is to be converted into a footpath and cycleway.

Filming location
Scenes from the Hollywood blockbuster Captain America: The First Avenger were filmed on site in October 2010. More recently, Caerwent was used in the television series Top Gear.

References

Citations

Bibliography
 Bowditch, M.R. and Hayward, L., (1996). A pictorial record of the Royal Naval Cordite Factory, Holton Heath. Wareham: Finial Publishing. .
 Cocroft, Wayne D., (2000). Dangerous Energy: The archaeology of gunpowder and military explosives manufacture. Swindon: English Heritage. .
 Walker, Thomas A., [1888] (2004). The Severn Tunnel: Its Construction & Difficulties: 1872 – 1887. Republished 2004. Stroud: Nonsuch Publishing.

External links
Subterranea site visit with photograph
Multimap map and aerial imagery
Aerial photograph 1999
Orienteering map 2007

Caerwent
History of Monmouthshire
Caerwent
Industrial railways in Wales
Scheduled monuments in Monmouthshire